This is a list of Canadian films which were released in 1971:

See also
 1971 in Canada
 1971 in Canadian television

References

1971
Canada
1971 in Canada